Bala Garhi is a town and union council of Mardan District in Khyber Pakhtunkhwa province of Pakistan. It is located at 34°14'0N 72°9'0E and has an altitude of 302 metres (994 feet).

References

Union councils of Mardan District
Populated places in Mardan District